The 1914 North Carolina Tar Heels football team represented the University of North Carolina in the 1914 college football season. The team captain of the 1914 season was Dave Tayloe.

Schedule

References

North Carolina
North Carolina Tar Heels football seasons
North Carolina Tar Heels football